A transverse flute or side-blown flute is a flute which is held horizontally when played. The player blows across the embouchure hole, in a direction perpendicular to the flute's body length.

Transverse flutes include the Western concert flute, the Indian classical flutes (the bansuri and the venu), the Chinese dizi, the Western fife, a number of Japanese fue, and Korean flutes such as daegeum, junggeum and sogeum.

See also
End-blown flute